Anthony John "A.J." Soprano Jr. is a fictional character on the HBO television series The Sopranos, portrayed by Robert Iler. He is the son of Carmela and Tony Soprano and the little brother of Meadow Soprano.

Biography

Anthony was born in 1985 and is the younger, more troubled child of Tony and Carmela. A chronic underachiever with moderate self-esteem issues, A.J. is diagnosed with borderline ADD. A.J.'s rebellious streak led him to crashing his mother's car, smoking marijuana at his own confirmation, getting drunk on stolen communion wine, vandalizing his school's swimming pool, and getting expelled from school after cheating on a test. As a result of his expulsion, his parents arranged to send him to military school until they discovered that he had the same anxiety and panic attacks that plagued his father and grandfather. Learning this, they decided to keep him in public school, but tried to keep an iron fist on him.

Despite all of his troubles, AJ is the spoiled child, as in the episode "Two Tonys" it is revealed that Tony had bought him an elaborate $5,000 drum set. Additionally, in the episode "All Happy Families...", Tony gets him an almost new Nissan Xterra as a "motivational tool". A.J. is excited about the SUV, however, he comments about the environmental impact of the SUV but he also states he may encounter social pressure from school friends to drive a different vehicle.

During the fifth season, A.J. shows an increasing amount of disrespect to his mother, presumably due to his parents' separation. He tends to relate better to his father and ends up moving in with him during the separation; however, in the episode "Sentimental Education" A.J. and Tony get into a scuffle over A.J.'s disrespect. As Tony has him pinned against the wall, A.J. says, "One of these days, you wait...I'm going to kick your fucking ass." Immediately afterward, A.J. decides he wants to move back in with his mother, threatening to call social services due to the ongoing "violence against children" present in his father's home. Carmela takes the opportunity to demand certain things from A.J. in return for allowing him to move back in (e.g., showing respect to his mother, not swearing, tending to schoolwork).

Frequently throughout the series, Tony and Carmela express concern about A.J.'s future. Tony has no desire to groom his son into a position within his organization. In the fifth season of the show, A.J. displays an unexpected interest in pursuing a career in event planning, but later derides his parents' mentions of it (e.g., in "Mr. & Mrs. John Sacrimoni Request...").

In "Full Leather Jacket", A.J. says that he wants to go to Harvard University or West Point for college. Tony dismisses the idea as unrealistic given A.J.'s poor academic performance. During Season 3, when Tony asks him about it at a family dinner, A.J. claims that he never said that, as he knows his grades wouldn't be good enough. Throughout Season 5, references are made to the unlikelihood of A.J.'s being admitted to a four-year university.

In Season 6A, A.J. admits to his parents that he has flunked out of the community college he was attending, a worrying parallel to Tony's own youth. After a senile Uncle Junior mistakes Tony as an intruder and shoots him, A.J. steals a large knife and goes to the institution Junior is being held, in a futile effort to exact revenge for his father. He is arrested but later released without charge thanks to his father's political connections. He delves deep into the New York City club scene and uses cocaine.

After several days of Anthony's claiming to be searching for jobs on the Internet with no result, Tony intervenes and arranges a construction job for his son. A.J. first claims he cannot do it because he will be trying again for community college, but Tony says that is not a problem as many of the men who work in construction are high school and college students. A.J. is reluctant to accept the job because of the early hours and outdoor work, which makes Tony angry. 

Tony grabs a football helmet and smashes the windshield of A.J.'s Nissan Xterra, and warns A.J. not to test him. A.J. reluctantly works at the construction site where he meets Blanca Selgado, whom he begins dating. Blanca, who is Dominican, 10 years A.J.'s senior, and has a three-year-old son named Hector, meets with Carmela's disapproval. Tony is more approving of the relationship, commenting that at least Blanca was Catholic like the Sopranos.

In Season 6B, A.J. proposes to Blanca at a fancy restaurant dinner, telling her that he will own a couple of restaurants in a couple of years. However, Blanca soon gives the ring back and breaks up with him, leaving A.J. severely depressed. His father tries to cheer him up, telling him there are many reasons he will meet other women and be successful in future relationships, including that he is smart, hard-working, and white, "a huge plus nowadays". 

He quits his job and mopes about until his father forces him to attend a fraternity party with the college-age relatives of his fellow Mafiosi. A.J. grudgingly attends, and soon starts to enjoy himself. Several of the boys run a sports betting operation at the college and after a night of drinking, they beat and torture a college student who neglected to pay them by pouring Battery acid on his foot. A.J. joins in to help forget his relationship problems. Later, he joins his new friends as they harass other students on the campus violently and physically. Following that, A.J. is seen telling his psychiatrist that he is once again depressed about the world due to that incident.

This depression leads to a botched suicide attempt, wherein A.J. ties a cinder block to his leg with a too-long length of rope and attempts to drown himself in the pool at the Soprano home. His father hears his cries for help and dives into the pool and rescues him. He is then placed in a facility to get psychiatric care, where he meets Rhiannon, an ex-girlfriend of his former friend Hernan. After Tony tells him that his uncle Bobby has been shot dead, A.J. begins to cry and complain about how Bobby's death negatively affects him. Tony loses patience with him, violently drags him out of his bed, slaps him around, and tells him to pack as the family leaves home quickly to elude a possible attack by the Lupertazzi family.

In the final episode, A.J. is in his Nissan Xterra with Rhiannon, his new girlfriend, and starts making out with her, but they both rush out of the vehicle when it catches fire due to A.J.'s parking it over a pile of leaves. After getting chewed out from Tony, A.J. decides to join the Army and does vigorous training for it. This scares Carmela as Iraq is considering moving all the soldiers close to Afghanistan, which begins to worry Tony as well, who decides to sit down with A.J., and successfully talks him out enlisting. Instead, Tony gets him a new BMW M3 and a job working for Little Carmine's film production company. The job, with the possibility of A.J. opening up his own nightclub, which Tony proposes to his son if he does well with the job, seems to alleviate A.J.'s depression, and he is last seen having dinner with his family.

In all seasons, A.J. is portrayed as a fan of heavy metal, via product placements (shirts, coats, posters and stickers) of bands like Pantera, Nevermore, Mudvayne (whose concert he attends in "All Happy Families"), Slipknot, Coal Chamber, Stuck Mojo, Machine Head, Soulfly and Fear Factory. By the end of the series, having grown more worldly and introspective, he discovers and begins analyzing the early work of Bob Dylan. Through various plot points and pieces of clothing, A.J. is identified as a fan of the New York Giants, New Jersey Devils and New York/New Jersey MetroStars.

References

External links
 HBO Profile: Anthony Soprano Jr.

American male characters in television
Atheism in television
Fictional atheists and agnostics
Fictional attempted suicides
Fictional cannabis users
Fictional characters from New Jersey
Fictional cocaine users
Fictional players of American football
Fictional Italian American people
The Sopranos characters
Teenage characters in television
Television characters introduced in 1999